Iran competed at the 2013 World Championships in Athletics from August 10 to August 18 in Moscow, Russia.
A team of 5 athletes was
announced to represent the country
in the event.

Results

(q – qualified, NM – no mark, SB – season best)

Men

Road and track events

Field events

Women

Field events

References

Nations at the 2013 World Championships in Athletics
World Championships in Athletics
Iran at the World Championships in Athletics